Milutin Vujičić (born Milutin Ostojić, 8 March 2002) is a Serbian professional basketball player for FMP of the Basketball League of Serbia and the ABA League on a loan from Crvena zvezda mts.

Early life 
Born in Podgorica, Yugoslavia (nowadays in Montenegro) as Milutin Ostojić, Vujičić spent his childhood in Foča, Bosnia and Herzegovina. He started to play basketball with KK Sutjeska Foča. Later he moved to the Crvena zvezda youth system.

Playing career 
In February 2021, head coach Dejan Radonjić added Vujičić to the Crvena zvezda mts roster for the 2021 Radivoj Korać Cup tournament in Novi Sad. On 11 February, he made his debut for Crvena zvezda in a 108–47 win over Radnički Kragujevac, making 3 points, 3 assists and a rebound in 11 minutes of playing time. Following a win over Mega Soccerbet in the Cup Finals, the Zvezda won its 10th National cup title while Vujičić won his first trophy. On 19 February, Vujičić was a member of the Zvezda roster for a EuroLeague game with Zenit Saint Petersburg without any played time. On 23 February, Vujičić officially signed a four-year professional contract with Crvena zvezda mts.

In May 2021, Vujičić was loaned to FMP for the 2021 Basketball League of Serbia playoffs. In August 2021, he was added to their roster for 2021–22 season.

National team career 
In January 2018, he was added to a 22-man preliminary roster of the Bosnia and Herzegovina national under-16 team for an international youth tournament in Sakarya, Turkey.

References

External links 
 Player Profile at realgm.com
 Milutin Ostojic at realgm.com
 Player Profile at aba-liga.com

2002 births
Living people
ABA League players
Basketball League of Serbia players
Bosnia and Herzegovina expatriate basketball people in Serbia
Bosnia and Herzegovina men's basketball players
KK Crvena zvezda players
KK FMP players
Point guards
Serbian men's basketball players
Serbs of Bosnia and Herzegovina
Sportspeople from Podgorica